Lower Rose is a hamlet in the parish of Perranzabuloe (where the population at the 2011 census was included.), Cornwall, England, UK.

References

Hamlets in Cornwall